The Oman Medical Specialty Board (OMSB) was established by the Royal Decree No. 31/2006, issued on 03 Rabai-I, 1427 H, corresponding to April 2, 2006. It is an independent body located in Muscat, Sultanate of Oman.  It is a Sponsoring Institution accredited by the Accreditation Council for Graduate Medical Education - International, that oversees the Graduate Medical Education in Oman.  OMSB formulates standards and criteria for practicing health care professions.

References

External links 
 

Medical and health organizations based in Oman
2006 establishments in Oman
Organizations established in 2006